ecycler is an environmental technology company and brand that provides a marketplace for discarders and collectors of recyclable waste in areas where no organized pickup is available.

Profile
The company's web site can also be used by households, institutions or businesses that do have curb-side recycling but want to have their recyclables picked up when and where they desire. If a collector of recyclables is not yet available in an area, the people discarding recyclables may post their materials on a bulletin board-an area ecycler calls the "recycling exchange." New or existing collectors may view materials listed on the exchange and then contact the discarder for a pick-up.

The site is driven by individual collectors who establish their own ecycler recycling programs. Collectors can create and market their own ecycler recycling programs by downloading posters generated by ecycler.com and then posting them in public places. Ecycler provides personalized business cards to collectors making them "independent collectors" and allowing them to share in the use of the ecycler name in setting up their recycling programs in their community.

Ecycler encourages people to discard their recyclables for free; however, discarders can request a portion of the proceeds from the collector. Collectors can take the recyclables to a redemption center or reverse vending machine and make either 100% profit or they can make a 60% profit by giving 40% to the person from whom they collected the recyclables. It is up to the person discarding the recyclables whether or not they want to simply give them away or earn some money themselves.

According to filterforgood.com, people who want to sign up as either discarders or collectors should know whether they live in a bottle-bill state. A “bottle bill,” also known as a “container deposit law" requires a minimum refundable deposit on beer, soft drink and other beverage containers in order to ensure a high rate of recycling or reuse.

The deposit-refund system was created by the beverage industry as a way to guarantee the return of their glass bottles to be washed, refilled and resold, filterforgood.com explains.

According to treehugger.com, the environmental benefit of ecycler might be reduced if it creates additional vehicle traffic: "While this is a great system to help get recyclables to recycling facilities in areas where there isn't curbside pickup provided by the city, we are still curious about the impact of having people most likely driving around in cars and pickup trucks collecting the recyclables and driving to centers to turn them in." Discarders can track the carbon credits on the site by listing how many recyclables they have given away through ecycler.com and on their own. Ecycler also allows collectors and discarders to rate their experiences with one another.

For non-traditional materials (tennis balls, wine bottle corks, eyeglasses, et al.) ecycler offers the opportunity to recycle these items that are not usually recyclable via local recycling centers.

History
The company was founded in February 2009 and launched to the public at TechCrunch50 2009. Although, the company is based in Lake Forest, Illinois, ecycler went live with its Canada specific site in April 2010.

Ecycler ceased its US and Canada operations on 31 Dec 13.

Press and awards
 2012 Illinois Technology Association CityLIGHTS Finalist
 2011 Included in Inc. Magazine's 20 Awesome Facebook Fan Pages
 2011 Named as one of the U.S. Chamber of Commerce 25 Free Enterprise Honorees for the "DREAM BIG Small Business of the Year Award"
 2011 Wins the Fairfield Small Business Challenge
 2010 Kim Komando Cool Site of the Day
 2010 Nominated for the Chicago Innovation Awards
 2010 One of Ten finalist in the Fairfield Small Business Challenge

Technology
Ecycler is hosted on a cloud computing platform developed on the LAMP stack.

Ecycler released an iOS application titled iCanRecycle in August 2011.

References

External links
 Official ecycler
 ecycler Canada
 SAFUN recap on TechCrunch50 2009

Companies based in Lake Forest, Illinois
Waste management companies of the United States
Renewable resource companies established in 2009
2009 establishments in Illinois